U.S. Renditions was a Special Projects Division of Books Nippan (which was the American branch of Nippon Shuppan Hanbai) and one of the pioneers of anime home video distribution in North America. The division was founded in February 1987 by Kevin Seymour, David Keith Riddick, Sho Nagata and Satoshi Komatsu. Robert Napton later joined the division and became a key figure in its productions.

After producing two music projects for the Robotech television series, U.S. Renditions produced the very first subtitled direct-to-home anime video for the American anime market. In March 1990, they began a release of a subtitled version of Gunbuster, followed in the same month by Dangaioh. They also released such subtitled hits as Appleseed and Black Magic M-66, and even began dubbing anime in 1992, the year their release of Dangaioh was completed. Their first dubbing projects included Macross II, Giant Robo and Fight! Iczer-One. These video projects were a joint venture with L.A. Hero, which was headed by Ken Iyadomi. U.S. Renditions also worked with U.S. Manga Corps on a select number of titles.

The company also had a label called Dark Image Entertainment, which was geared for mature audiences. Titles under Dark Image Entertainment included Ambassador Magma, Devilman and Guyver: Out of Control.

U.S. Renditions had a deal with Manga Entertainment's UK Division to distribute selected anime titles and have them dubbed in-house, before Island Records established Manga's North American operations via its acquisition of L.A. Hero in 1994.

When Books Nippan ceased operations in the mid-1990s, U.S. Renditions was dissolved. Books Nippan's animation division was later acquired by Digital Manga.  Kevin Seymour went on to become a successful anime English voice director and co-founded Animaze. Robert Napton became the director of Bandai U.S.A.'s manga division. Ken Iyadomi went on to produce/co-produce domestic releases by Manga Entertainment and Bandai Entertainment. Although some of their releases have seen re-release through Bandai Visual USA (which subsequently merged with Bandai Entertainment), Manga Entertainment and Media Blasters, other titles such as the original uncut subtitled version of Dangaioh, Ambassador Magma and Guyver: Out of Control were never re-released and have remained out of print on home video.

Releases

References

 Akemi's Anime World: U.S. Renditions/Dark Image Entertainment Company Info

Anime companies
Publishing companies established in 1987
Carson, California